The Troféu Brasil de Atletismo (Brazil Athletics Trophy) is an annual track and field meeting which serves as Brazil's national championships for athletics clubs. The Brazilian Athletics Confederation has not explicitly designated an annual national championships, thus this also serves as the de facto senior athletics championships.

Men

100 metres
1991: Robson da Silva
1992: Robson da Silva
1993: Robson da Silva
1994: Sidnei Telles de Souza
1995: Robson da Silva
1996: Arnaldo Silva
1997: André Domingos
1998: Claudinei da Silva
1999: Claudinei da Silva
2000: Vicente de Lima
2001: Claudinei da Silva & Raphael de Oliveira
2002: Vicente de Lima
2003: Édson Ribeiro
2004: Vicente de Lima
2005: Vicente de Lima

200 metres
1991: Robson da Silva
1992: Robson da Silva
1993: Robson da Silva
1994: Robson da Silva
1995: Robson da Silva
1996: Claudinei da Silva
1997: André Domingos
1998: Claudinei da Silva
1999: Claudinei da Silva
2000: Claudinei da Silva
2001: André Domingos
2002: Vicente de Lima
2003: André Domingos
2004: André Domingos
2005: Vicente de Lima

400 metres
1991: Roberto Bortolotto
1992: Inaldo Sena
1993: Eronilde de Araújo
1994: Inaldo Sena
1995: Inaldo Sena
1996: Sanderlei Parrela
1997: Sanderlei Parrela
1998: Valdinei da Silva
1999: Sanderlei Parrela
2000: Valdinei da Silva
2001: Flávio Godoy
2002: Flávio Godoy
2003: Anderson Jorge dos Santos
2004: Anderson Jorge dos Santos
2005: Sanderlei Parrela

800 metres
1991: José Luíz Barbosa
1992: 
1993: José Luíz Barbosa
1994: José Luíz Barbosa
1995: José Luíz Barbosa
1996: Flávio Godoy
1997: José Luíz Barbosa
1998: Flávio Godoy
1999: Hudson de Souza
2000: Osmar dos Santos
2001: Valdinei da Silva
2002: Osmar dos Santos
2003: Osmar dos Santos
2004: Fabiano Peçanha
2005: Fabiano Peçanha

1500 metres
1991: José Luíz Barbosa
1992: Edgar de Oliveira
1993: Edgar de Oliveira
1994: Edgar de Oliveira
1995: Joaquim Cruz
1996: Joaquim Cruz
1997: Hudson de Souza
1998: Hudson de Souza
1999: Hudson de Souza
2000: Hudson de Souza
2001: Hudson de Souza
2002: Hudson de Souza
2003: Fabiano Peçanha
2004: Hudson de Souza
2005: Fabiano Peçanha

5000 metres
1991: Valdenor dos Santos
1992: Clodoaldo do Carmo
1993: Ronaldo da Costa
1994: Ronaldo da Costa
1995: Elenilson da Silva
1996: Adalberto García
1997: Valdenor dos Santos
1998: Valdenor dos Santos
1999: Elenilson da Silva
2000: Valdenor dos Santos
2001: Elenilson da Silva
2002: Hudson de Souza
2003: Marílson Gomes dos Santos
2004: Hudson de Souza
2005: Hudson de Souza

10,000 metres
1991: Valdenor dos Santos
1992: Valdenor dos Santos
1993: Valdenor dos Santos
1994: Valdenor dos Santos
1995: Valdenor dos Santos
1996: Adalberto García
1997: Valdenor dos Santos
1998: Ronaldo da Costa
1999: Elenilson da Silva
2000: Valdenor dos Santos
2001: Elenilson da Silva
2002: Elenilson da Silva
2003: Marílson Gomes dos Santos
2004: Marílson Gomes dos Santos
2005: Franck de Almeida

3000 metres steeplechase
1991: Wander Moura
1992: Clodoaldo do Carmo
1993: Wander Moura
1994: Wander Moura
1995: Eduardo do Nascimento
1996: Clodoaldo do Carmo
1997: Wander Moura
1998: Wander Moura
1999: 
2000: Wander Moura
2001: Celso Ficagna
2002: Celso Ficagna
2003: Fernando Fernandes
2004: 
2005: Fernando Fernandes

110 metres hurdles
1991: Joilto Bonfim
1992: Joilto Bonfim
1993: Joilto Bonfim
1994: Walmes de Souza
1995: Joilto Bonfim
1996: Emerson Perín
1997: Pedro Chiamulera
1998: Márcio de Souza
1999: Márcio de Souza
2000: Márcio de Souza
2001: Walmes de Souza
2002: Mateus Facho Inocêncio
2003: Redelén dos Santos
2004: Redelén dos Santos
2005: Mateus Facho Inocêncio

400 metres hurdles
1991: Eronilde de Araújo
1992: Eronilde de Araújo
1993: Eronilde de Araújo
1994: Eronilde de Araújo
1995: Eronilde de Araújo
1996: Eronilde de Araújo
1997: Eronilde de Araújo
1998: Eronilde de Araújo
1999: Eronilde de Araújo
2000: Eronilde de Araújo
2001: Eronilde de Araújo
2002: Cleverson da Silva
2003: Eronilde de Araújo
2004: Raphael Fernandes
2005: Tiago Bueno

High jump
1991: Jorge Archanjo
1992: José Luís Mendes
1993: José Luís Mendes
1994: Alcides Silva
1995: Marcos dos Santos
1996: Wagner Príncipe
1997: Wagner Príncipe
1998: Wagner Príncipe
1999: Fabrício Romero
2000: Wagner Príncipe
2001: Fabrício Romero
2002: Fabrício Romero
2003: Jessé de Lima
2004: Jessé de Lima
2005: Fábio Baptista

Pole vault
1991: Marlon Borges
1992: Renato Bortolocci
1993: Pedro da Silva
1994: Marlon Borges
1995: 
1996: Pedro da Silva
1997: 
1998: Gustavo Rehder
1999: Gustavo Rehder
2000: Gustavo Rehder
2001: Henrique Martins
2002: Henrique Martins
2003: 
2004: Henrique Martins & João Gabriel Sousa
2005: Fábio da Silva

Long jump
1991: Paulo de Oliveira
1992: Márcio da Cruz
1993: Paulo de Oliveira
1994: Douglas de Souza
1995: Nélson Carlos Ferreira
1996: Douglas de Souza
1997: Cláudio Novães
1998: Douglas de Souza
1999: Sérgio dos Santos
2000: Nélson Carlos Ferreira
2001: Nélson Carlos Ferreira
2002: Jadel Gregório
2003: 
2004: Jadel Gregório
2005: Erivaldo Vieira

Triple jump
1991: Anísio Silva
1992: Abcélvio Rodrigues
1993: Anísio Silva
1994: Anísio Silva
1995: Anísio Silva
1996: Anísio Silva
1997: Messias José Baptista
1998: Antônio da Costa
1999: Sérgio dos Santos
2000: Sérgio dos Santos
2001: Jadel Gregório
2002: Jadel Gregório
2003: Jadel Gregório
2004: Jadel Gregório
2005: Jadel Gregório

Shot put
1991: Adilson Oliveira
1992: Adilson Oliveira
1993: Adilson Oliveira
1994: Adilson Oliveira
1995: Adilson Oliveira
1996: Adilson Oliveira
1997: Édson Miguel
1998: Édson Miguel
1999: Édson Miguel
2000: Édson Miguel
2001: Adilson Oliveira
2002: Adilson Oliveira
2003: Daniel Freire
2004: Daniel Freire
2005: Daniel Freire

Discus throw
1991: João dos Santos
1992: João dos Santos
1993: João dos Santos
1994: João dos Santos
1995: João dos Santos
1996: João dos Santos
1997: 
1998: 
1999: João dos Santos
2000: João dos Santos
2001: Mateus Monari
2002: João dos Santos
2003: João dos Santos
2004: Gustavo de Mendonça
2005: Ronald Julião

Hammer throw
1991: Pedro Rivail Atílio
1992: Pedro Rivail Atílio
1993: Pedro Rivail Atílio
1994: Mário Leme
1995: Pedro Rivail Atílio
1996: Mário Leme
1997: 
1998: Mário Leme
1999: 
2000: Mário Leme
2001: Mário Leme
2002: Mário Leme
2003: Mário Leme
2004: Marcos dos Santos
2005: Wagner Domingos

Javelin throw
1991: Nivaldo Beje Filho
1992: Ivan Costa
1993: Luiz da Silva
1994: Luiz da Silva
1995: Luiz da Silva
1996: Luiz da Silva
1997: Luiz da Silva
1998: Luiz da Silva
1999: Luiz da Silva
2000: Luiz da Silva
2001: Luiz da Silva
2002: Luiz da Silva
2003: Luiz da Silva
2004: Júlio César de Oliveira
2005: Luiz da Silva

Decathlon
1991: Pedro da Silva
1992: José de Assis
1993: José de Assis
1994: José de Assis
1995: Pedro da Silva
1996: Pedro da Silva
1997: José de Assis
1998: 
1999: Edson Bindilatti
2000: Edson Bindilatti
2001: Edson Bindilatti
2002: Edson Bindilatti
2003: Edson Bindilatti
2004: Edson Bindilatti
2005: Ivan da Silva

20,000 metres walk
1991: Marcelo Palma
1992: Sérgio Galdino
1993: Sérgio Galdino
1994: Sérgio Galdino
1995: Cláudio Bertolino
1996: Sérgio Galdino
1997: Sérgio Galdino
1998: Sérgio Galdino
1999: Sérgio Galdino
2000: Sérgio Galdino
2001: Sérgio Galdino
2002: Sérgio Galdino
2003: Sérgio Galdino
2004: José Alessandro Bagio
2005: Sérgio Galdino

Women

100 metres
1991: Claudete Alves Pina
1992: Claudete Alves Pina
1993: Cleide Amaral
1994: Cleide Amaral
1995: Cleide Amaral
1996: Lucimar de Moura
1997: Lucimar de Moura
1998: Kátia Regina Santos
1999: Lucimar de Moura
2000: Lucimar de Moura
2001: Lucimar de Moura
2002: Kátia Regina Santos
2003: Lucimar de Moura
2004: Lucimar de Moura
2005: Lucimar de Moura

200 metres
1991: Claudete Alves Pina
1992: Claudete Alves Pina
1993: Cleide Amaral
1994: Kátia Regina Santos
1995: Cleide Amaral
1996: Maria Magnólia Figueiredo
1997: Lucimar de Moura
1998: Kátia Regina Santos
1999: Lucimar de Moura
2000: Lucimar de Moura
2001: Lucimar de Moura
2002: Kátia Regina Santos
2003: Lucimar de Moura
2004: Rosemar Coelho Neto
2005: Lucimar de Moura

400 metres
1991: Maria Magnólia Figueiredo
1992: Luciana Mendes
1993: Maria Magnólia Figueiredo
1994: Maria Magnólia Figueiredo
1995: Luciana Mendes
1996: Maria Magnólia Figueiredo
1997: Maria Magnólia Figueiredo
1998: Maria Magnólia Figueiredo
1999: Lorena de Oliveira
2000: Luciana Mendes
2001: Maria Laura Almirão
2002: Geisa Coutinho
2003: Geisa Coutinho
2004: Geisa Coutinho
2005: Lucimar Teodoro

800 metres
1991: Maria Magnólia Figueiredo
1992: Maria Magnólia Figueiredo
1993: Maria Magnólia Figueiredo
1994: Fátima dos Santos
1995: Luciana Mendes
1996: Luciana Mendes
1997: Luciana Mendes
1998: Célia dos Santos
1999: Luciana Mendes
2000: Luciana Mendes
2001: Luciana Mendes
2002: Josiane Tito
2003: Luciana Mendes
2004: Luciana Mendes
2005: Christiane dos Santos

1500 metres
1991: Rita de Jesus
1992: Maria Magnólia Figueiredo
1993: Soraya Telles
1994: Soraya Telles
1995: Célia dos Santos
1996: Célia dos Santos
1997: Fabiana Cristine da Silva
1998: Viviany de Oliveira
1999: Célia dos Santos
2000: Fabiana Cristine da Silva
2001: Fabiana Cristine da Silva
2002: Fabiana Cristine da Silva
2003: Juliana Paula dos Santos
2004: Juliana Paula dos Santos
2005: Juliana Paula dos Santos

3000 metres
1991: Carmem de Oliveira
1992: Carmem de Oliveira
1993: Viviany de Oliveira

5000 metres
1994: Silvana Pereira
1995: Roseli Machado
1996: Roseli Machado
1997: Fabiana Cristine da Silva
1998: Viviany de Oliveira
1999: Fabiana Cristine da Silva
2000: Fabiana Cristine da Silva
2001: Fabiana Cristine da Silva
2002: Fabiana Cristine da Silva
2003: Maria Rodrigues
2004: Fabiana Cristine da Silva
2005: Fabiana Cristine da Silva

10,000 metres
1991: Carmem de Oliveira
1992: Carmem de Oliveira
1993: Carmem de Oliveira
1994: Silvana Pereira
1995: Roseli Machado
1996: Carmem de Oliveira
1997: Solange de Souza
1998: Márcia Narloch
1999: Nadir Sabino Siqueira
2000: Márcia Narloch
2001: Lucélia Peres
2002: Lucélia Peres
2003: Ednalva da Silva
2004: Maria Baldaia
2005: Lucélia Peres

2000 metres steeplechase
1998: Magda Azevedo

3000 metres steeplechase
1999: Soraya Telles
2000: Michelle Costa
2001: Maria Lúcia Vieira
2002: Marily dos Santos
2003: Michelle Costa
2004: Michelle Costa
2005: Michelle Costa

100 metres hurdles
1991: Lucy Conceição
1992: Lucy Conceição
1993: Vânia da Silva
1994: Vânia dos Santos
1995: 
1996: Vânia da Silva
1997: Maurren Maggi
1998: Maurren Maggi
1999: Maurren Maggi
2000: Maurren Maggi
2001: Maíla Machado
2002: Maíla Machado
2003: Gilvaneide Parrela
2004: Maíla Machado
2005: Maíla Machado

400 metres hurdles
1991: Maria dos Santos
1992: Jupira da Graça
1993: Jupira da Graça
1994: Marise da Silva
1995: Maria dos Santos
1996: Maria dos Santos
1997: Ana Paula Pereira
1998: Jupira da Graça
1999: Ana Paula Pereira
2000: Ana Paula Pereira
2001: Isabel Silva
2002: Isabel Silva
2003: Lucimar Teodoro
2004: Lucimar Teodoro
2005: Lucimar Teodoro

High jump
1991: Orlane dos Santos
1992: Mônica Lunkmoss
1993: Orlane dos Santos
1994: Orlane dos Santos
1995: Orlane dos Santos
1996: Orlane dos Santos
1997: Luciane Dambacher
1998: Luciane Dambacher
1999: 
2000: Thaís de Andrade
2001: Luciane Dambacher
2002: Thaís de Andrade
2003: Luciane Dambacher
2004: Eliana da Silva
2005: Eliana da Silva

Pole vault
1995: Conceição Geremias
1996: Márcia Hennemann
1997: Miriam Schwuchow
1998: Patrícia Jiacomussi
1999: Joana Costa
2000: Karla Rosa da Silva
2001: Fabiana Murer
2002: Karla Rosa da Silva
2003: Karla Rosa da Silva
2004: Joana Costa
2005: Fabiana Murer

Long jump
1991: Rita Slompo
1992: 
1993: Maria de Souza
1994: Maria de Souza
1995: 
1996: Luciana dos Santos
1997: Maria de Souza
1998: Maria de Souza
1999: Maurren Maggi
2000: Maurren Maggi
2001: Maurren Maggi
2002: Maurren Maggi
2003: Maurren Maggi
2004: Keila Costa
2005: Keila Costa

Triple jump
1991: Rita Slompo
1992: Rita Slompo
1993: Maria de Souza
1994: Maria de Souza
1995: 
1996: Cida de Souza
1997: Maria de Souza
1998: Maria de Souza
1999: Luciana dos Santos
2000: Luciana dos Santos
2001: Luciana dos Santos
2002: Maurren Maggi
2003: Keila Costa
2004: Keila Costa
2005: Keila Costa

Shot put
1991: Elisângela Adriano
1992: Elisângela Adriano
1993: Elisângela Adriano
1994: Alexandra Amaro
1995: Elisângela Adriano
1996: Elisângela Adriano
1997: Elisângela Adriano
1998: Elisângela Adriano
1999: Elisângela Adriano
2000: Elisângela Adriano
2001: Elisângela Adriano
2002: Elisângela Adriano
2003: Elisângela Adriano
2004: Elisângela Adriano
2005: Andrea Pereira

Discus throw
1991: Rosana Piovesan
1992: Elisângela Adriano
1993: Elisângela Adriano
1994: Elisângela Adriano
1995: Amélia Moreira
1996: Elisângela Adriano
1997: Elisângela Adriano
1998: Elisângela Adriano
1999: Elisângela Adriano
2000: Elisângela Adriano
2001: Elisângela Adriano
2002: Elisângela Adriano
2003: Elisângela Adriano
2004: Elisângela Adriano
2005: Renata de Figueirêdo

Hammer throw
1994: Maria Pacheco
1995: Maria Pacheco
1996: Josiane Soares
1997: 
1998: Josiane Soares
1999: Josiane Soares
2000: Josiane Soares
2001: 
2002: Margit Wahlbrink
2003: Katiuscia de Jesus
2004: Katiuscia de Jesus
2005: Josiane Soares

Javelin throw
1991: Sueli dos Santos
1992: 
1993: Sueli dos Santos
1994: Sueli dos Santos
1995: Alessandra Resende
1996: Carla Bispo
1997: Carla Bispo
1998: Alessandra Resende
1999: Sueli dos Santos
2000: Sueli dos Santos
2001: Alessandra Resende
2002: Alessandra Resende
2003: 
2004: 
2005: Alessandra Resende

Heptathlon
1991: Orlane dos Santos
1992: Ana Lúcia Silva
1993: Conceição Geremias
1994: Joelma Souza
1995: Euzinete dos Reis
1996: Euzinete dos Reis
1997: Euzinete dos Reis
1998: Euzinete dos Reis
1999: Euzinete dos Reis
2000: Euzinete dos Reis
2001: Elizete da Silva
2002: Patrícia de Oliveira
2003: Elizete da Silva
2004: Merli Caldeira
2005: Lucimara da Silva

10,000 metres walk
1991: Ivana Henn
1992: Ivana Henn
1993: Nailse Pazin
1994: Ivana Henn
1995: Nailse Pazin
1996: Gianetti Bonfim
1997: Gianetti Bonfim
1998: Gianetti Bonfim

20,000 metres walk
1999: Gianetti Bonfim
2000: Gianetti Bonfim
2001: Gianetti Bonfim
2002: Gianetti Bonfim
2003: Cisiane Lopes
2004: Alessandra Picagevicz
2005: Alessandra Picagevicz

References

Champions 1991–2005
Brazilian Championships. GBR Athletics. Retrieved 2021-02-13.

Winners
 List
Brazilian Championships
Athletics